Hua Tuo ( 140–208), courtesy name Yuanhua, was a Chinese physician who lived during the late Eastern Han dynasty. The historical texts Records of the Three Kingdoms and Book of the Later Han record Hua Tuo as the first person in China to use anaesthesia during surgery. He used a general anaesthetic combining wine with a herbal concoction called mafeisan (literally "cannabis boil powder"). Besides being respected for his expertise in surgery and anaesthesia, Hua Tuo was famous for his abilities in acupuncture, moxibustion, herbal medicine and medical Daoyin exercises. He developed the Wuqinxi (literally "Exercise of the Five Animals") from studying movements of the tiger, deer, bear, ape and crane.

Historical accounts

The oldest extant biographies of Hua Tuo are found in the official Chinese histories for the Eastern Han dynasty (25-220) and Three Kingdoms period (220-280) of China. The third-century historical text Records of Three Kingdoms (Sanguozhi) and fifth-century historical text Book of the Later Han (Houhanshu) record that Hua Tuo was from Qiao County, Pei Commandery, which is in present-day Bozhou, Anhui, and that he studied Chinese classics throughout Xu Province (covering parts of present-day Jiangsu and Shandong provinces). He refused employment offers from high-ranking officials (e.g. Chen Gui) and chose to practise medicine.

The dates of Hua Tuo's life are uncertain. Estimations range from 110 to 207, and from 190 to 265 conclude that the "best estimate" is circa 145-208. Hua Tuo was an older contemporary of the physician Zhang Zhongjing (150-219).

The name Hua Tuo combines the Chinese surname Hua (literally "magnificent; China") with the uncommon Chinese given name Tuo ( literally "hunchback" or  literally "steep hill"). He was also known as Hua Fu (literally "apply [powder/ointment/etc.]"), and his courtesy name was Yuanhua (literally "primal transformation").

Some scholars believe that he learned Ayurveda medical techniques from early Buddhist missionaries in China. Victor H. Mair describes him as "many hundreds of years ahead of his time in medical knowledge and practice", and suggests his name Hua Tuo, which was roughly pronounced ghwa-thā in Old Chinese, could derive from the Sanskrit term agada "medicine; toxicology". Several stories in Hua Tuo's biography "have a suspiciously Ayurvedic character to them" and he was active "in the areas where the first Buddhist communities were established in China".

Hua Tuo's biography in the Sanguozhi describes him as resembling a Daoist xian ("immortal") and details his medical techniques. 

Hua Tuo's biography in the Houhanshu explains this mafeisan "numbing boiling powder" decoction was dissolved in jiu (literally "alcoholic beverage; wine"). His prescription for mafeisan anaesthetic liquor was lost or destroyed, along with all of his writings. The Book of Sui lists five medical books attributed to Hua Tuo and his disciples, but none are extant.

The subsequent portion of Hua Tuo's biography in the Sanguozhi lists 16 medical cases: ten internal medicine, three surgical, two gynaecological, and one paediatric case. Hua Tuo's treatment of diseases was centred on internal medicine, but also included surgery, gynaecology and paediatrics. He removed parasites, performed abortions and treated ulcers, sores and analgesia. For example: 

Cao Cao (155-220), a warlord who rose to power towards the end of the Han dynasty and laid the foundation for the Cao Wei state in the Three Kingdoms period, is probably Hua Tuo's best known patient. He suffered from chronic headaches, which were possibly caused by a brain tumour.  Cao Cao's condition has also been translated as "migraine headaches accompanied by mental disturbance and dizziness" and the acupuncture point on the sole as identified as Yongquan ("bubbling fountain").

Cao Cao ordered Hua Tuo to be his personal physician – a job Hua Tuo resented.  In order to avoid treating Cao Cao, Hua Tuo repeatedly made excuses that his wife was ill, but Cao Cao discovered the deception and ordered Hua Tuo's execution. Xun Yu, one of Cao Cao's advisers, pleaded for mercy on behalf of the physician. 

Hua Tuo wrote down his medical techniques while awaiting execution, but destroyed his Qing Nang Shu (literally "green bag book", which became a Classical Chinese term for "medical practices text").  This loss to traditional Chinese medicine was irreplaceable. Ilza Veith notes that, "Unfortunately, Hua T'o's works were destroyed; his surgical practices fell into disuse, with the exception of his method of castration, which continued to be practised. Due to the religious stigma attached to the practice of surgery, the social position accorded to the surgeon became increasingly lower and thus made a revival of Chinese surgery impossible." A Liezi legend claims that the renowned physician Bian Que ( 500 BCE) used anaesthesia to perform a double heart transplantation, but the fourth-century text was compiled after Hua Tuo used mafeisan.

Cao Cao later regretted executing Hua Tuo when his son Cao Chong (196–208), a child prodigy who may have independently discovered and used Archimedes' principle, died from illness.  The Sanguozhi does not specify Hua Tuo's exact date of death, but since Cao Chong died in 208, Hua Tuo could not have lived past that year.

Hua Tuo's biography ends with accounts of his disciples Wu Pu and Fan A.  Fan A was skilled at acupuncture and inserted the needles to extraordinary depths. Victor H. Mair notes this unusual name may indicate Fan A was a foreigner, and this area was around present-day Tongshan County, Jiangsu, the "location of the first known Buddhist community in China".  These herbs are qiye (Toxicodendron vernicifluum leaves) and qingdian (Sigesbeckia orientalis).

The Song dynasty Confucianist scholar Ye Mengde (1077–1148) criticised the Sanguozhi and Houhanshu biographies of Hua Tuo as being mythological. His "Physicians Cannot Raise the Dead" essay repeated the descriptions of Hua Tuo using anaesthesia to perform internal surgery, and reasoned, 

In later times, a set of 34 paravertebral acupuncture points was named "Hua Tuo Jiaji" in his honour. Hua Tuo is considered a shenyi ("divine physician") and is worshipped as a medicinal Deity or immortal in some Chinese temples. "Hua Tuo zaishi" ("Hua Tuo reincarnated") is also an honourable term of respect that will be  bestowed to a highly-skilled physician.

Fictional accounts

In the 14th-century historical novel Romance of the Three Kingdoms, Hua Tuo heals the general Guan Yu, who is hit by a poisoned arrow in the arm during the Battle of Fancheng in 219. Hua Tuo offers to anaesthetise Guan Yu, but he simply laughs and says that he is not afraid of pain. Hua Tuo uses a knife to cut the flesh from Guan Yu's arm and scrape the poison from the bone, and the sounds strike fear into all those who heard them. During this excruciating treatment, Guan Yu continues to play a game of weiqi with Ma Liang without flinching from pain. When Ma Liang asks him later, Guan Yu says that he feigned being unhurt to keep the morale of his troops high. After Hua Tuo's successful operation, Guan Yu allegedly rewards him with a sumptuous banquet, and offers a gift of 100 ounces of gold, but Hua Tuo refuses, saying that a physician's duty is to heal patients and not to make profit. Although Hua Tuo historically died in 208, a decade before Guan Yu fought at the Battle of Fancheng, this story of him performing surgery on Guan Yu has become a popular artistic theme.

The historical document Sanguozhi recorded that there were actually a bone surgery performed on Guan Yu, and Guan Yu indeed showed no painful expression. Sanguozhi neither told the name of the surgeon nor the time of the operation, though.

Hua Tuo is later summoned by Cao Cao to cure a chronic excruciating pain in his head, which turns out to be due to a brain tumour. Hua Tuo tells Cao Cao that in order to remove the tumor, it would be necessary to open up the brain by cutting open the head, getting the tumor out, and sewing it back, with Cao Cao completely anesthesized in the process. However, Cao Cao suspects that Hua Tuo is planning to murder him so he has Hua Tuo arrested and imprisoned. (Cao Cao's suspicions are in part due to a previous attempt by Ji Ping, an imperial physician, to force him to consume poisoned medicine.)

In Romance of the Three Kingdoms, Hua Tuo passes his Qing Nang Shu to a prison guard so that his medical legacy will live on. He dies in prison later. The prison guard's wife burnt the book for fear of being implicated, but the guard manages to salvage some pages, which are about how to emasculate hen and ducks; the other pages are lost forever.

Mafeisan
Hua Tuo's innovative anaesthetic mafeisan (literally "cannabis boiling powder", considered to be the first anesthetic in the world), which was supposedly used on Hua Tuo's patients during surgery, is a long-standing mystery. The Records of the Three Kingdoms and the Book of the Later Han both credit him as creating this anesthetic during the Eastern Han Dynasty. However, no written record or ingredients of the original have been found, although estimations have been made by Chinese medical practitioners in later periods of time. There is controversy over the historical existence of mafeisan in Chinese literature.

The name mafeisan combines ma ("cannabis; hemp; numbed"), fei ("boiling; bubbling") and san ("break up; scatter; medicine in powder form"). Ma can mean "cannabis; hemp" and "numbed; tingling" (e.g. mazui  "anesthetic; narcotic"), which is semantically "derived from the properties of the fruits and leaves, which were used as infusions for medicinal purposes".

Modern Standard Chinese mafei is reconstructed as Old Chinese *mrâipəts, Late Han Chinese maipus (during Hua Tuo's life), and Middle Chinese mapjwəi.

Many sinologists and scholars of traditional Chinese medicine have guessed at the anaesthetic components of mafei powder. Frederick P. Smith contends that Hua Tuo, "the Machaon of Chinese historical romance", used yabulu ("Mandragora officinarum") rather than huoma ("cannabis") and mantuolo ("Datura stramonium", nota bene, Hua's given name "Tuo") "infused in wine, and drunk as a stupefying medicine".

Herbert Giles (1897:323) translates mafeisan as "hashish"; and his son Lionel Giles identifies "hemp-bubble-powder" as "something akin to hashish or bhang". Ilza Veith quotes the sinologist Erich Hauer's "opinion that ma-fei means opium". Victor H. Mair notes that mafei "appears to be a transcription of some Indo-European word related to "morphine"". Although Friedrich Sertürner first isolated morphine from opium in 1804, Mair suggests, "It is conceivable that some such name as morphine was already in use before as a designation for the anaesthetic properties of this opium derivative or some other naturally occurring substance." Wang Zhenguo and Chen Ping find consensus among "scientists of later generations" that mafei contained yangjinhua ("Datura stramonium") and wutou ("rhizome of Aconitum, Chinese monkshood") or caowu ("Aconitum kusnezofflin; Kusnezoff monkshood").

Lu Gwei-Djen and Joseph Needham suggest Hua Tuo may have discovered surgical analgesia by acupuncture, "quite apart from the stupefying potions for which he became so famous – if so he kept it to himself and his immediate disciples so that the secret did not survive".

See also
 Zhang Zhongjing
 Dong Feng
 Huangfu Mi
 Lists of people of the Three Kingdoms

References

External links

Hua Tuo, Subhuti Dharmananda
Hua Tuo: A miraculous healer in ancient China , Association for Asian Research
A Brief Biography of Hua Tuo, John Chen
Shifu Alan Tinnion - Five Animal Frolics Hua Tuo Nei Gong 華 佗 內 功

2nd-century Chinese physicians
3rd-century executions
Cannabis in China
Cao Cao and associates
Executed Han dynasty people
Executed people from Anhui
Health gods
People executed by the Han dynasty
People from Bozhou
Physicians from Anhui
Qigong
Taoist immortals
Year of birth uncertain
Year of death uncertain
3rd-century Chinese physicians